"Pretty Belinda" is a song written and recorded by Chris Andrews, which he released as a single in July 1969.

Commercial success 
The single did not enter the UK singles charts but it reached the No. 1 spot in Austria and peaked at No. 3 in Germany. It was released in South Africa in December 1969, where it peaked at No. 1. Andrews's follow-up single Carole OK was less successful but also reached No. 1 in South Africa where it was released in April 1970.
A 1970 Ola Håkansson recording, "Söta Belinda", was released as a single. scoring a Svensktoppen hit for 11 weeks between 26 July-4 October 1970, peaking at position 3.

Chart positions

In popular culture 
The song was used as theme music for Filip och Fredrik's Swedish tv series 100 höjdare, aired from 2004 to 2008. That version was performed by accordionist Roland Cedermark.

References 

1969 songs
1969 singles
Chris Andrews (singer) songs
Songs written by Chris Andrews (singer)
Four Jacks and a Jill songs
RCA Victor singles